An Amazing Couple; also known as (Trilogy: Two) is a 2002 French-Belgian film written and directed by Lucas Belvaux.

This is the first installment of a series Trilogy, which constitutes a comedy followed by One: On the run, a thriller and Three: After life, a melodrama. In Uk the distribution company altered the order of the trilogy placing the second film as the first one.

Belvaux referred in the DVD commentary that main idea behind Trilogy is that the main characters in a particular story are the secondary characters of others, in such sense the three films happen at the same time and share a series of common scenes and plot points, complementing each other, but also have their own perspective and style. The audience is left with piecing the films together, which Belvaux avoided, since editing the three films into one single narrative would have resulted in a very long film with no style of its own.

Plot

On a Friday evening, just before closing time Alain Coste is in his office and gets ready to leave, Claire, his PA, manages to stall him a couple of minutes, he goes out and she steals his keys just before he comes back for his jacket. Claire calls Cécile Coste to report that Alain has left. Alain goes to see Georges Colinet, his physician who tells him that he has tennis elbow and must have an operation. Alain becomes very worried that this operation shall take his life despite all assurances to the contrary. Later on Alain goes to a park and he starts a series of will projects that he dictates in a pocket tape recorder that he carries around, the first will distributes his assets 50/50% to his wife and children, 98% of his company shall go to his children and the remaining 2% to Claire and some moneys that he has in a Swiss bank-account shall go to the Fund for Cancer Research.

At home Cécile is worried that Alain is not back yet and assumes that the worst has happened (which she does all the time). It is clear that she is preparing a surprise birthday party for Alain, her daughter Louise is there with her boyfriend Henry helping in the kitchen. Police lights are visible from the kitchen and Cécile goes to the door, but it is Police Inspector Pascal Manise who arrives to drop his wife Agnès. The doorbell rings, it is Dr. Colinet who arrives. In the meantime Alain is lost in his own neighbourhood, he cannot find his house and comes close to having a car accident with Manise; when finally home he tells Cécile that he was late because he gave Claire a ride home. The party begins and Rémy and Louise sing "Les roses blanches" to him instead of "Happy Birthday to You". When Agnès congratulates Alain she says "may you have more days like this", which he takes as a dark omen. Georges assures him that nothing is wrong with him and gives him back his keys to a chalet Alain owns in the nearby mountains, which he used for a romantic escapade.

When alone at the kitchen, Cécile confronts Alain and tells him that it is not true that he gave Claire a ride home and he then says that he actually had a car accident, as she is about to check out the car, Agnès faints; Alain uses that opportunity to create the "accident" that he had, which means hitting his Jaguar with a hammer. Meanwhile, Cécile has reached Manise over the phone and tells him that Agnès is sick. He arrives and takes her away. While waiting for Manise, Cécile sees that the car has not had the exhaust changed as Alain had said earlier.

The next day after a debate at school, Cécile asks Pascal to tail Alain because he is hiding something from her. Manise tells her that it is preferable to be honest and ask her husband directly but she refuses. Meanwhile, in his office Alain has a sudden spasm and begins dictating his ever growing symptoms in his recorder, he leaves the office (which Claire reports to Cécile, who has been keeping a record of all his comings and goings) and goes to the park where he meets Louise, who tells her father that Henry dumped her because she cheated on him. Manise is close by and all he sees is that Alain is meeting with a younger woman, but when he reports it to Cécile she recognizes her daughter and is relieved that there is not another woman. At school Agnès is very worried because Manise had to arrest Jeanne, a colleague teacher and friend.

Manise asks Cécile to check the bank accounts for unusual charges, she does so despite Claire's warnings that Alain shall notice, they find nothing. During lunch Alain is designing several gadgets on a table mat and Manise is drinking coffee, he leaves the bar and says goodbye to everyone at the bar in a very French fashion which catches Alain's attention. Manise goes back to Alain's office and poses as a policeman from the financial branch, insinuating that Alain is involved in some questionable businesses, which Claire denies, however he manages to take a lock of Claire's hair without her noticing. On his way out he crosses Alain who is puzzled to see him again and asks Clair who he was and she says that he was a copying-machine representative. Alain sits at his desk and notices that things are not exactly where he left them and asks Claire to retrieve his newspaper, which he forgot at the bar. When she leaves he redials the last phone and sees that Claire was not talking to her mother but to Cécile. He also notices that Manise is still outside and manages to shake his tail, then he rushes home turning the house upside down looking for something and finds Cécile's notes on him, he changes his will: nothing for Cécile or Claire, all for the children with a warning not to trust their mother.

That night Cécile goes to Manise's place to confront him about scaring Claire, she does not know that Alain is following her. Manise however, notices that Alain is close by and makes it look as if Cécile is having an affair with him and asks her to take him to the police station. Manise also reveals that Agnès is addicted to drugs and that the day of the party she fainted due to withdrawal syndrome. Before they can leave Alain is assaulted by thugs. Alain then goes to Claire's and forces a confession from her. Alain goes back home and tells Cécile that he must go to Paris for a couple of days.

The next day Cécile drops Alain at the train station but he comes out a few seconds later to take a taxi, however Manise is still tailing him. While in the taxi Alain changes his will again: the money for the Cancer Research is diminished. The taxi driver tells Alain that he is being followed and manages to lose Manise again, but Manise finds the taxi driver and shows him his badge. Meanwhile, at the hospital Alain tells Georges about the person who is tailing him but Georges reassures him, Alain changes his will: the money for the Cancer Research fund is increased. As he gets an anesthetic shot from Georges' nurse who turns out to be the lover that he took to the chalet, looks out the window and sees Manise talking to Dr. Colinet in the parking lot. He flees but no taxi shall take him.

As Cécile is about to enter the school where she works, Manise tells her that Alain did not take the train to Paris and ventures that he is probably in a hotel with someone else. Cécile goes to the school and finds that everyone is celebrating Jeanne's release from prison. Agnès asks if she can borrow her car and if she can use the chalet, Cécile angrily accepts. Meanwhile, Alain has managed to get on the countryside by foot and calls for Claire to help him. When she arrives the anaesthetic has kicked in and Alain lies unconscious in the middle of the field, Claire manages to wake him up. As they drive to the chalet Alain again drops asleep and drives off the road while drawing conclusions on the "plot" against his life, he finally wakes up and steps out of the car, he changes his will again: Claire gets her inheritance back. When backing up to the main road, Alain spots his wife's car with another car behind her. He follows and hears a man inside his chalet singing in Italian. He then assumes that his wife is connected to the Mafia and are plotting to kill him because of some of his inventions, Claire does not see the "connection". Meanwhile, Dr. Colinet has reported Alain's disappearance to Manise. Alain and Claire go to the police but see Manise and Dr. Colinet walking out of the station together and conclude that they are together in the plot with his wife.

Alain and Claire go to their place, with Manise on their tail. She tells him that he must do something, but by then his paranoia has kicked in and he has begun adding up facts into a big scheme to kill him, which also involves his children, based on the song that they sang to him at his birthday and the changes that they made to fit him (the song involves the story of a poor boy who has to steal flowers for his dying mother in the hospital, only to find that when he finally arrives, she is already dead), Alain changes his will again: all goes to Claire. As they talk, enters Vincent, Claire's boyfriend and an employee of Alain's who is back home due to a working accident, but Alain does not believe him since the prescription is signed by Dr. Georges Colinet, thus Vincent is in the plot too. Cécile comes back home and finds that Louise has moved back in, when she discovers the reason (Louise had cheated on her boyfriend and he dumped her) she is so angry that she slaps her daughter and also draws a conclusion that Agnès is the one having an affair with Alain. She picks Agnès at the street and drives up to the chalet but finds that a man named Pierre is there and it seems that Agnès' story is true. Cécile confronts Georges about the truth related to her husband's whereabouts but he does not betray anything and acts surprised when she tells him that Alain is not in Paris.

Alain has interrogated Vincent and although he does not get a confession, he ties Vincent to Claire's bed. They go to Alain's place where he connects his recording machine to the telephone to spy on Cécile, he is discovered by Louise who then agrees to call him if anything strange happens related to Cécile. During this conversation it is revealed that the only reason that his children sang "Les roses blanches" to him is because he sang that song all the time regardless of the occasion, because it was the only one he knew.

Cécile arrives home and has another fight with Louise. She spends the night crying and close to dawn Manise tells her that Alain is at Claire's. As they leave, Cécile notices that her car is gone but asks Manise not the release a police notice on it, she assumes that her daughter took it. They go to Claire's but cannot find Alain. As they leave, Claire asks Vincent to follow them, Manise notices it and beats Vincent, thinking he is one of a drug dealer's thugs who have been following him. Back in his car he tells Cécile that he is being blackmailed by Agnès' dealer, Cécile asks him to take her to her chalet, where she confronts Pierre, she believes that he is the drug dealer, he tells her that Manise is a wife beater. As they are about to leave, Manise tells Cécile that he is in love with her. She becomes very angry and slaps him and explodes with all her cruelty to him and leaves.

Meanwhile, Alain is taking Vincent to the hospital but when he sees Dr. Colinet, he goes bezerk and crashes Vincent into the wall and beats Georges until the orderlies finally stop him. After he is restrained Alain gets a call from Louise, Cécile has not shown up for work, he calls the police, Manise goes back for Cécile and they go to her house. Alain finally reveals the reason for his secrecy and she is more at ease but not before she consults with Georges about the real gravity of his situation, a conversation that is spied by Alain through the window.

Cast

Reception

A. O. Scott from The New York Times wrote that "And An Amazing Couple isn't either, exactly. The film's tableau of duplicity and innocent schemes gone awry is shadowed by the grim business of On the Run and the swelling pathos of After the Life. Some of the scenes are like mislaid puzzle pieces, and they snap into place only when all three movies have been seen and absorbed. This makes watching any one of the episodes both more interesting and more frustrating than it might otherwise be, since a portion of dramatic satisfaction is always withheld". Desson Thomson of The Washington Post stated "Bruno from the first movie. In the throes of trying to kill the same gangster who supplies Agnes' heroin, he befriends Agnes. You can watch these films in any order. The joy is in watching the narrative intersections and changing your perceptions of the characters. Each movie casts light on the others. And after watching all three, a profound blending of the stories percolates in your head". Ruthe Stein from San Francisco Chronicle wrote "It's a complicated assignment Belvaux has given himself. Although he falls short of acing it, he is to be commended for experimenting with the possibilities of cinema". Jamie Russell from BBC wrote that "In the best tradition of madcap comedy, the craziness eventually reaches insane asylum levels as straitjackets and sedatives are wheeled out to cope with the manic events. Yet, for all the humour, our awareness of the darker, more dangerous world lying in wait outside the frame (the world of Trilogy 1 and, later, 3) tempers the film's energetic laughs". David Stratton from Variety wrote "'An Amazing Couple' is a completely different experience. Alain (Francois Morel) runs a small hi-tech engineering company; he is married to teacher Cecile, and they seem to be a blissfully happy couple. But Alain has come to the conclusion that he's terminally ill. A chronic worrier, he's convinced that some minor symptoms which he's experiencing are the beginning of the end. Camerawork is softer and brighter here, the editing more relaxed. The character of Bruno, who was center-stage in 'On the Run,' is seen only briefly, and introduces himself as Pierre."

References

External links

2002 films
Belgian romantic comedy films
2000s French-language films
Films directed by Lucas Belvaux
Louis Delluc Prize winners
French romantic comedy films
2002 romantic comedy films
French-language Belgian films
2000s French films